is an arcade-based fantasy collectible card game developed by Think Garage and distributed by Square Enix in which players control combat cards on an arcade play surface. The objective of the game is to destroy the enemy team's Arcana Stones and eliminate their servants in order to win the game. Players design and develop avatars, increasing their statistics and obtaining equipment, then compete with each other locally, or online, or play the single player story mode.

As of November 7, 2008, Lord of Vermilion has contributed over ¥4 billion in earnings for Square Enix.

A sequel, Lord of Vermilion II, was released in Japan on October 27, 2009, and was followed up by Lord of Vermilion Re:2 on July 26, 2011. The sequels prominently featured collaborations with a number of other franchises and game series, including the Final Fantasy, Romancing SaGa, Magic: The Gathering, The King of Fighters, Touhou and BlazBlue.

It has also spawned a spinoff franchise of action RPG titles for the PlayStation Portable and PlayStation Vita, including Lord of Arcana and Lord of Apocalypse.

Another sequel, Lord of Vermilion III, was released on August 22, 2013.

A free-to-play third-person action multiplayer online battle arena (MOBA), Lord of Vermilion Arena, was officially launched on June 17, 2015. The servers were closed on June 30, 2016 

In Final Fantasy XIV a parody real-time strategy (RTS) game using in-game minions called Lord of Verminion was made in reference and parody to Lord of Vermilion on November 10, 2015.

On January 26, 2017, Square Enix announced the development of Lord of Vermilion IV. Another arcade release for up to eight players, it featured music by Taku Iwasaki.

Gameplay

The player controls up to 4 units on the field at one time including the player's avatar and up to 90 total cost of units at one time.  When a unit dies it must be returned to the inactive area and after a set amount of time it can be used again.  Active units can only be switched in and out while the players units are in the gate area.  Players can damage enemy arcane crystals, the search eye, the crystal shield or gates by putting their units in the associated area as long as no enemies are present.  Players can also damage the arcane crystals by destroying all of the opponents units that are on the field.

Story
In ancient times, before the creation of the worlds, there lived a God. He opened his heart and brought forth a vermilion stone in order to create seven different worlds. Whosoever held the vermilion stone held the power to create worlds, and would reign over the seven worlds as a god, the "Lord of Vermilion". The seven worlds existed side by side in harmony for millennia, their inhabitants separated by boundaries and unable to interfere with one another... until the "Great Collapse".

The lord of the human world, consumed by ambition, sought to use the forbidden magic of the vermilion stone, called the "Arcana", in order to become a god. However, he was unable to wield the power and the Arcana was shattered into seven pieces and scattered amongst the seven worlds, destroying their boundaries. The six worlds were drawn into the human world and they merged. With the six races of the six worlds thrust into the human world, chaos and war broke out.

Ages later, the world, called the "Land of Acheron", is still in turmoil. The six "Lords" of the six races sow strife across the land, warring for each other's Arcana. The player takes the role of a legendary warrior who holds the seventh Arcana and seeks to obtain the Arcana and upset the balance of the world, gathering an army of "Familiars" who hold faith in the legend of the "Lord of Vermilion".

Characters

Player Character: The player character is one of the few humans to survive the Great Collapse, and can be customized by the player. A legendary warrior with mysterious origins, the player seeks to use the power of Arcana, "Miracle", to reshape the world and return harmony to the land, and as such gathers an army of faithful followers in order to wage war on the six "Lords" and become the "Lord of Vermilion". There are two characters which the player may select from: the male , or the female . They each have similar backstories and roles within the story mode.
Dux: A mysterious knight completely clad in heavy armor, which completely conceals their identity and gender, who first appears in the tutorial and holds extensive knowledge on Arcana and the world. Dux is later revealed to be a former friend of the player's deceased father who agreed to watch over the player several years earlier.

Expansion sets

Lord of Vermilion
Version 1.1: 
Version 1.2: 
Version 1.3: 
Version 1.4:

Lord of Vermilion II
Version 2.1: 
Version 2.5: 
Version 2.6:

Contributing artists
To date, contributing guest artists include:

Other media

References

External links
 Video game websites:
 Official Lord of Vermilion Site
 Official Lord of Vermilion II Site
 Official Lord of Vermilion III Site
 Official Lord of Vermilion IV Site
 Official franchise website
 Official Lord of Vermilion II Blog
 Official Lord of Vermilion Arena Site

2008 video games
2009 video games
2013 video games
2017 video games
Arcade video games
Arcade-only video games
Digital collectible card games
Card games introduced in 2008
Collectible card games
Fantasy video games
Fiction about monsters
Fiction about government
Japan-exclusive video games
Mass media franchises
Monarchy in fiction
Multiplayer video games
NESiCAxLive games
Role-playing video games
Science fantasy video games
Square Enix franchises
Square Enix games
Superhero video games
Taito games
Video game franchises
Video game franchises introduced in 2008
Video games about parallel universes
Video games featuring female protagonists
Video games scored by Hitoshi Sakimoto
Video games scored by Nobuo Uematsu
Video games set in Asia
Video games set in Europe
Video games set in the future
Video games set in Japan
Video games set in London
Video games set in Tokyo
Video games set in the United Kingdom
Video games developed in Japan
Think Garage games